Villeneuve-en-Perseigne is a commune in the Sarthe department in the Pays de la Loire region in north-western France. It was formed on 1 January 2015 by the merger of the former communes La Fresnaye-sur-Chédouet, Chassé, Lignières-la-Carelle, Montigny, Roullée and Saint-Rigomer-des-Bois.

See also
Communes of the Sarthe department

References

Communes of Sarthe